Neshel (also Romanized as Neshal; also known as Nesel) is a village in Chelav Rural District, in the Central District of Amol County, Mazandaran Province, Iran. At the 2006 census, its population was 251, in 96 families.

References 

Populated places in Amol County